Douglas Csima (born 21 November 1985 in Mississauga) is a Canadian rower.

He won a silver medal at the 2012 Summer Olympics in the men's eight with Andrew Byrnes, Gabriel Bergen, Jeremiah Brown, Will Crothers, Robert Gibson, Malcolm Howard, Conlin McCabe and Brian Price.

References

External links
 

1985 births
Living people
Canadian male rowers
Rowers at the 2012 Summer Olympics
Olympic rowers of Canada
Olympic medalists in rowing
Olympic silver medalists for Canada
Medalists at the 2012 Summer Olympics
Sportspeople from Mississauga
World Rowing Championships medalists for Canada
21st-century Canadian people